61 Virginis c (abbreviated 61 Vir c) is an exoplanet orbiting the 5th apparent-magnitude G-type main-sequence star 61 Virginis in the constellation Virgo. 61 Virginis c has a minimum mass of 18.2 times that of Earth and orbits one-fifth the distance to the star as Earth orbits the Sun, at a precise distance of 0.2175 AU with an eccentricity of 0.14. This planet would most likely be a gas giant like Uranus and Neptune. This planet was discovered on 14 December 2009 from using a precise radial velocity method taken at Keck and Anglo-Australian Observatories.

See also 
 List of star systems within 25–30 light-years

References

External links 
 

61 Virginis
Exoplanets discovered in 2009
Exoplanets detected by radial velocity
Virgo (constellation)
Hot Neptunes
Giant planets